Dallas Township is a township in DeKalb County, in the U.S. state of Missouri.

Dallas Township was established in 1845, taking its name from Vice President George M. Dallas.

References

Townships in Missouri
Townships in DeKalb County, Missouri